Ángel Dealbert Ibáñez (born 1 January 1983) is a Spanish former footballer who played as a central defender.

He spent most of his 17-year senior career at Castellón, representing the club in three levels of Spanish football while playing 220 competitive matches. He appeared for Valencia in La Liga, and also competed professionally in Russia and the United Arab Emirates.

Club career
Born in Benlloch, Province of Castellón, Valencian Community, Dealbert began his career with local CD Castellón. He made his first-team debut on 20 April 2002 in a third division match against Benidorm CF, and went on to become an essential defensive element, winning promotion in the 2004–05 season and helping the club consolidate in the second level in the following years.

In late December 2008, Valencia CF's sporting director Fernando Gómez, who played for both sides, announced the signing of Dealbert on a free transfer. However, the player was allowed to remain at Castellón until the end of the campaign.

After 24 La Liga games in his first year, Dealbert was used solely as a backup from 2010 to 2012, with the Che finishing in third position in all three seasons. He made his debut in the Spanish top flight on 30 August 2009, playing the full 90 minutes in a 2–0 home win over Sevilla FC.

In June 2012, Dealbert signed a three-year contract with FC Kuban Krasnodar. After two years as first-choice in the Russian Premier League he left the club, joining UAE Arabian Gulf League side Baniyas SC.

Dealbert returned to his native country on 3 August 2015, moving to CD Lugo from division two. He scored once from 36 appearances in his first year, helping to a 14th-place finish.

In the summer of 2017, 34-year-old Dealbert returned to Castellón after eight years, with the team now in the fourth tier. Additionally, he became the club's co-owner alongside former Valencia teammate Pablo Hernández, winning promotion at the first attempt and subsequently retiring, following which he was appointed their technical secretary; they both left due to disagreements regarding the team in April 2019, but kept their position as shareholders.

Club statistics

References

External links

CiberChe biography and stats 

1983 births
Living people
People from Plana Alta
Sportspeople from the Province of Castellón
Spanish footballers
Footballers from the Valencian Community
Association football defenders
La Liga players
Segunda División players
Segunda División B players
Tercera División players
CD Castellón footballers
Valencia CF players
CD Lugo players
Russian Premier League players
FC Kuban Krasnodar players
UAE Pro League players
Baniyas Club players
Spanish expatriate footballers
Expatriate footballers in Russia
Expatriate footballers in the United Arab Emirates
Spanish expatriate sportspeople in Russia
Spanish expatriate sportspeople in the United Arab Emirates